Route 408 or Highway 408 may refer to:

Canada
 Manitoba Provincial Road 408

Costa Rica
 National Route 408

Japan
 Japan National Route 408

United States
  Florida State Road 408
  Georgia State Route 408 (unsigned designation for Interstate 475
  Louisiana Highway 408
  Maryland Route 408
 Maryland Route 408
 New York:
  New York State Route 408
 New York State Route 408A (former)
 New York State Route 408 (former)
 County Route 408 (Albany County, New York)
  County Route 408 (Erie County, New York)
  Pennsylvania Route 408
  Puerto Rico Highway 408
  Texas State Highway Spur 408
  Virginia State Route 408 (former)